Ust-Urma (Ürmyn Adag) is a rural locality (an ulus) in Selenginsky District, Republic of Buryatia, Russia. The population was 267 as of 2010. There are nine streets.

Geography 
Ust-Urma is located 70 km southwest of Gusinoozyorsk (the district's administrative centre) by road. Gusinoye Ozero is the nearest rural locality.

References 

Rural localities in Selenginsky District